Le Miroir de l'eau (The Mirror of Water) was a French mini-series directed by Edwin Baily and consisting of four episodes of one-hundred minutes each. It was first broadcast between 9 and 30 August 2004 on France 2.

Synopsis
Antoine Marange returns to his home near Aix-en-Provence after sailing around the world, only to learn that the girl he had loved twenty-five years earlier, Isaure Castella, has drowned in the lake 'Waters Mirrors'. Her drowning was suspicious and Antoine's return unveils a lot of mysteries.

For some time, Gabrielle has had the feeling that Isaure is back. It started with the reopening of her bedroom that her mother had locked in order not to awaken the past. Additionally, Alice, the daughter of Alexandra, has visions and regularly sees Isaure in "Water Mirrors". Alexandra is the mistress of both Nicolas and Robin. This latter is a police inspector whose relationship with Alexandra is rather strained. Fortunately, he meets Anna, Alice's teacher, who is actually about to marry, but is confused and in search of her identity.

To make matters worse, the niece of Antoine, Anais, drowns in the same way as Isaure. The inspector Robin is in charge of the inquiry, and the investigation will unveil secrets that had been buried with great care by the grandmother of the family, Suzanne Castella.

Cast
 Line Renaud as Suzanne Castella
 Christiana Reali as Gabrielle Castella-Aubry
 Clémentine Célarié as Josépha Beaulieu
 Bernard Yerlès as Antoine Marange
 Clio Baran as Elena Aubry
 Jean-Claude Adelin as Nicolas Aubry
 Thierry Neuvic as Robin Lary
 Gaëla Le Devehat as Anna Fauve
 Didier Bienaimé as Paul Marange
 Valérie Mairesse as Jeanne Marange
 Caroline Baehr as Alexandra
 Gabrielle Vallières as Alice
 Milan Argaud as Raphaël Marange
 Jean-Marie Juan as Emmanuel
 François Caron as Mathieu Beaulieu
 Malcolm Conrath as Guillaume Chardin
 Lizzie Brocheré as Anaïs Marange
 Julien Bravo as Yann
 Karina Testa as Isaure Castella

2000s French drama television series
2004 French television series debuts
2004 French television series endings
Television shows set in France